Mark J. Poznansky  (born April 5, 1946) is a research scientist, science administrator and science blogger. He is the past president and CEO of the Ontario Genomics Institute (OGI) and was previously chair of the board of OGI,  and the founder of G2G Consulting Inc. He is a member of the Order of Canada,  a member of the Order of Ontario and was CEO, president and scientific director of Robarts Research Institute.

Education and early career history

Born in Montreal, Poznansky was educated at McGill University, receiving his PhD in Physiology in 1970.  Poznansky completed his postdoctoral training in Biophysics at Harvard Medical School in 1972, where he held the position of Lecturer in Biophysics until 1976. He also served as charge de recherche at the Collège de France in Paris from 1973 to 1974.

Poznansky returned to Canada in 1976, taking a position as associate professor  of physiology at the University of Alberta in Edmonton.  Over the next 18 years, he rose to the rank of Professor and his laboratory developed an international reputation both the areas of cholesterol and membrane biophysics as well as enzyme replacement therapy and the development of novel approaches to drug delivery.  In 1984, Poznansky moved on to become the associate dean of medicine at the University of Alberta in Edmonton, a position he held for 9 years.

Robarts Research Institute and the London years

In 1993, Poznansky arrived in London, Ontario, as president and scientific director of Robarts Research Institute.  He presided over a period of growth, not only in funding and employment but in technology transfer as well.  Under his helm from 1993 until 2007, Robarts Research Institute increased its staff from just over 100 to over 600. Annual research funding increased from $10 million per year to over $40 million annually and the Institute spun out 7 different companies including one that was sold to GE Healthcare.

While at Robarts, Poznansky served as president and CEO of London-based Viron Therapeutics Inc. The company was able to bring a candidate drug to the start of Phase II and raised $20 million to support future research efforts.

He was among a group that founded the London Biotechnology Incubator Inc., Ontario's first Life Sciences incubator.  They was able to gain financial support to build a 50,000 sq. ft. facility in London.

The rapid physical and staffing growth of the Institute led to major financial issues in 2007, necessitating the take-over of the Robarts by the University of Western Ontario. Poznansky stepped down as scientific director at that time.

G2G Consulting

In 2008, Poznansky founded G2G Consulting Inc., services such as program reviews, mediation, strategic planning, change management, leadership training and mentoring and management restructuring.

Poznansky developed a process to help the Spanish government support the life sciences industry. He worked with the Canada Foundation for Innovation.

He helped form a research partnership made up of Robarts Research Institute, Merck & Co, Merck Frosst Canada and GE Healthcare that was able to receive funding of $20 million over four years, resulting in many key research findings and publications on the subject of lung disease.  Poznansky helped change the way the University of Alberta, Edmonton conducted research and helped facilitate the amalgamation of the research administration that occurred when Ottawa Civic and Ottawa General Hospitals merged to create The Ottawa Hospital.  He also aided the Thunder Bay Regional Institute in attracting not only some of the "most respected health research minds in Canada" but those from around the globe.

Poznansky completed the negotiation and advanced negotiation workshops at the Harvard Negotiation Institute, Harvard Law School.

Ontario Genomics Institute

Poznansky was appointed as president and CEO of the Ontario Genomics Institute (OGI) on December 1, 2010. He served in this capacity until August 1, 2017. At OGI, Poznansky helped develop the Think Synthetic Biology campaign that identified the role that synthetic biology can play in advancing research for the wellbeing of Ontarians.

Spindle

On August 1, 2017, Poznansky joined Spindle, a strategic consulting firm that focuses on life and health sciences innovation, as a member of its Senior Advisory Group.

Saved By Science Website

In November 2019, Poznansky launched Saved By Science, a website at www.savedbyscience.org where he blogs on four subjects related to the world of science - the environment, food, health and politics/policy. The website includes blogs on synthetic biology and climate change.

Saved By Science: The Hope and Promise of Synthetic Biology

On September 22, 2020, ECW Press released Saved By Science: The Hope and Promise of Synthetic Biology. Kirkus Reviews said the book was "energetic and optimistic" and “shows how synthetic biology can be used to contend with major issues involving health, food, and the environment." An excerpt of Saved By Science: The Hope and Promise of Synthetic Biology appeared in the Toronto Star on September 19, 2020   and in Canadian Geographic on September 23, 2020   Dr. Poznansky was interviewed about the book on September 22, 2020 on SXM Canada Talks  and the Gill Deacon Show on the Canadian Broadcasting Corporation English radio network.

Chairs and board memberships

Poznansky is Chair of Let's Talk Science, Chief Science Advisor to the CEO of the Thunder Bay Regional Research Institute and a board member of the Innovation Institute of Ontario.

Poznansky is a founding member and past Chair of the Council for Health Research in Canada, a research advocacy group in Ottawa.  He also chaired the Scientific Advisory Board of the Canadian Medical Discoveries Fund and the board of MDS Capital Corp.

He is a board member of the International Barcode of Life.

He has sat on the boards of organizations such as Diabetogen, BioMark Inc. and TechAlliance, London.  Poznansky has also been a member of science-related committees including the Science Advisory Committee of the Heart and Stroke Foundation of Canada and the Medical Research Council of Canada Grants Panel.

Guest lecturing

Poznansky lectures on subjects related to the biopharmaceutical industry and research and administration and funding, including technology transfer. He also lectures on Jewish medical ethics as it pertains to human and animal experimentation.

In 2017, Dr. Poznansky lectured on the Scientific Revolution at the Dr. Louis Siminovitch Lecture Series.

He discussed Genomics Hype and Hope at the 2018 Notable Speakers Series held in Toronto.

Dr. Poznansky presented at a session at the 2019 Canadian Science Conference on:  Policy Lessons in the Age of Technological Disruption.

Other accomplishments

In 2005, Poznansky was made a member of the Order of Canada  and a member of the Order of Ontario. He is also the recipient of the Queen Elizabeth II Golden Jubilee Medal.

Poznansky led the development of the book Using Our Heads, "a celebration of innovation that was supported by the Ontario Innovation Trust (OIT)."

He is one of the founders of the Canadian Medical Hall of Fame, and served on its board of directors from 1994 to 2001.

References

External links

Ontario Innovation Trust Using Our Heads Website
Congratulations to Order of Canada appointees
G2G Consulting Inc. Website
Let’s Talk Science Website
Ontario Genomics Institute Website
Spindle Website
Think Synthetic Biology Website
Saved By Science Website

1946 births
Canadian physiologists
Living people
Canadian management consultants
Members of the Order of Ontario
Members of the Order of Canada
Scientists from Montreal
McGill University Faculty of Science alumni
Academic staff of the University of Alberta
Academic staff of the Collège de France
Harvard Medical School alumni
20th-century Canadian scientists
21st-century Canadian scientists
Canadian biophysicists